BM-21UM "Berest" - a promising Ukrainian 122 mm Multiple rocket launcher. The system is based on the KrAZ-5401 cargo chassis and the modernized BM-21 Grad launcher. Instead of 40 missiles in the Grad launcher, Berest launcher has 50 missiles.

History 
The BM-21UM Berest system was presented for the first time at the Weapons and Security 2018 exhibition, which took place on October 9–12 in Kyiv. "Berest" is a deep modernization of BM-21 Grad, and is designed to replace it.

"Berest" was made by Shepetivka repair plant for its own working capital.

Gallery

See also 

 Verba (MRLS)

References

External links 

 "Шепетівський ремонтний завод" представив українську РСЗВ БМ-21УМ "Берест" // Укроборонпром, 9 жовтня 2018
 БМ-21 УМ Берест - нова бойова машина на базі КрАЗу // АвтоКрАЗ, 16 жовтня 2018
 Сергій Жмурко, «Шепетівський ремонтний завод» провів успішні ходові випробування РСЗВ БМ-21УМ «Берест» // АрміяInform, 23 серпня 2019

Multiple rocket launchers
122 mm artillery
Weapons of Ukraine